Federico Ramón Puerta (born 9 September 1951) is an Argentine Peronist politician who has served as a governor, national senator and deputy and briefly as President of Argentina in 2001.

Biography

Puerta was born in Apóstoles, Misiones Province. He attended the Universidad Católica Argentina in Buenos Aires and qualified as a civil engineer. However, he entered the family business of the cultivation of yerba maté, and became a successful businessman and millionaire.

Puerta was elected a national deputy for Misiones in 1987. In 1991 he was elected Governor of Misiones Province, re-elected in 1995 and served until 1999. He followed the neo-liberal economic model of President Carlos Menem, including privatising the provincial bank of which his own grandfather had been a founder.

In 1999 he was re-elected to the Chamber of Deputies and in 2001 he was elected to the Senate. In November of that year, he was elected provisory president of the Argentine Senate, constitutionally third in line to the nation's presidency.

Puerta served as the acting head of the executive branch of the country for two days on December 21–22, 2001. He came to that position in his capacity as President Pro Tempore of the Senate and, as there was no vice president, he was next in line to the nation's highest office when President Fernando de la Rúa resigned amid rioting. A week after giving up the presidency, Puerta resigned as leader of the Senate in order to avoid retaking the presidency, following a second institutional crisis.

Puerta stood to be Governor of Misiones in 2003, but lost to his successor, Carlos Rovira. He retired from the Senate in 2005. He ran for governor of Misiones again in 2007, and was defeated in the October election, coming in third place with 15% of the vote.

Personal life
Puerta is unmarried and has two children.

References

External links
Sitio oficial de Ramón Puerta
Former senate profile
'Quién es Ramón Puerta?', BBC World, 2001-12-21, accessed 2006-08-13

1951 births
Living people
People from Apóstoles
Argentine people of Spanish descent
Pontifical Catholic University of Argentina alumni
Argentine businesspeople
Members of the Argentine Senate for Misiones
Justicialist Party politicians
Governors of Misiones Province
Members of the Argentine Chamber of Deputies elected in Misiones
Acting presidents of Argentina
Knights Grand Cross of the Order of Isabella the Catholic